Bontaqin (also Romanized as Bonţāqīn; also known as Banţāgān, Bon Taghin, and Bonţāqān) is a village in Amjaz Rural District, in the Central District of Anbarabad County, Kerman Province, Iran. At the 2006 census, its population was 24, in 7 families.

References 

Populated places in Anbarabad County